Santoalla is a 2016 documentary film about the deterioration in neighbor relations in a small Spanish village.

Synopsis 
Spanning over several decades, Santoalla tells the story of the Dutch couple Margo Pool and her husband Martin Verfondern as they settle into a village known as Santoalla (also written as Santa Eulalia) in the remote mountainous region of Galicia in northwest Spain.

The village, largely abandoned and slowly crumbling into ruins, gradually comes to be occupied by only one other family, the Rodríguezes. At first amicable, tensions begin to rise between the two families as disputes over land usage, cultural differences, and misinterpreted intentions culminate into the mysterious disappearance of Martin Verfondern in 2010. Intertwined with newsreel footage, archival video montages, and interviews with Pool herself, the documentary shifts between the past and “present”, showcasing the progression in the relationship between the neighbors culminating in a tragic end.

Production and release 
The film was produced by Radical Media and distributed by the indie distribution company Oscilloscope. Directors Andrew Becker and Daniel Mehrer were heavily involved in the creative process while producing.

The film first premiered June 17, 2016. It was released to streaming services on July 9, 2017 and limited screenings in theatres on July 19, 2017.

Reception 
Santoalla received largely positive reviews from critics. The review aggregator website Rotten Tomatoes reported an 85% approval rating with an average rating of 7.9/10 based on 100+ reviews.

Neil Young of The Hollywood Reporter described Santoalla as "A quietly absorbing true-crime tale" and wrote that "handling nearly all key creative duties between them, Becker and Mehrer have crafted a solid, even-handed survey of their chosen material, allowing viewers access to a beautiful, damply verdant, enticingly tumbledown corner of Europe." Kennet Turan of the Los Angeles Times wrote that the film is "Nominally focused on one man's mysterious disappearance, Santoalla is really concerned with cultures in collision, with what happens when dreams of paradise clash, good intentions become unhinged and the darker angels of our nature gain the upper hand." He noted that "Santoalla is a strong addition to the group" of similar documentaries.

Awards and nominations

References

External links 
 

American documentary films
Spanish documentary films
Galician-language films
2016 films
2016 documentary films
2010s English-language films
2010s American films